The 2006 AFC President's Cup was the second season of the AFC President's Cup, a competition for football clubs in countries categorized as "emerging nations" by the Asian Football Confederation. The eight teams that compete are split up into two groups and play each other team in their group once. The winner of each group then plays the runner up in the other group in the semifinals, and the winners of the semifinal matches play in the final match to determine the winner. There is no third place match. The games were played in May 2006 and were held in Kuching, Malaysia.

Venues

Qualifying teams

Group stage

Group A

Group B

Knockout stage

Semi-finals

Final 

Assistant referee:
Silva Benjamin (India)
Ahmed Ameez (Maldives)
Fourth official:
Ram Krishna Gosh (Bangladesh)

External links 
 2006 AFC President's Cup

2006 in Asian football
2005
2006
2006 in Malaysian football
2006 in Bhutanese football
2006 in Cambodian football
2006 in Taiwanese football
2006 in Kyrgyzstani football
2006 in Tajikistani football
2005–06 in Sri Lankan football
2005–06 in Pakistani football
2006 in Nepalese sport